Nora Township is one of twenty-three townships in Jo Daviess County, Illinois, USA.  As of the 2010 census, its population was 370 and it contained 168 housing units.

Geography

Cities, towns, villages
 Nora.

Cemeteries
The township contains these three cemeteries:
 East Chelsea.
 West Chelsea.
 Nora.

Major highways
  Illinois Route 78.

Demographics

School districts
 Lena Winslow Community Unit School District 202.
 Stockton Community Unit School District 206.
 Warren Community Unit School District 205.

Political districts
 Illinois' 16th congressional district.
 State House District 89.
 State Senate District 45.

References
 
 United States Census Bureau 2007 TIGER/Line Shapefiles.
 United States National Atlas.

External links
 Jo Daviess County official site.
 City-Data.com.
 Illinois State Archives.
 Township Officials of Illinois.

Townships in Jo Daviess County, Illinois
Townships in Illinois